The 2015 Citrus Bowl was an American college football bowl game played on January 1, 2015 at the Orlando Citrus Bowl in Orlando, Florida. The 69th edition was one of the 2014–15 NCAA football bowl games that conclude the 2014 NCAA Division I FBS football season. The game started at approximately 1:00 p.m. EST and was televised by ABC. It was sponsored by the Buffalo Wild Wings restaurant franchise and is officially known at the Buffalo Wild Wings Citrus Bowl.

Teams
The Minnesota Golden Gophers represented the Big Ten Conference, and the Missouri Tigers represented the Southeastern Conference.

This was Missouri's second appearance in the game and first as a member of the SEC; the Tigers defeated Southern Miss, 19–17, in 1981, while representing the Big Eight Conference. This was  Minnesota's first appearance in the game.

Game summary

Scoring summary

Source:

Statistics

References

Citrus Bowl
Citrus Bowl (game)
Minnesota Golden Gophers football bowl games
Missouri Tigers football bowl games
2010s in Orlando, Florida
Citrus Bowl
Citrus Bowl